South Carolina was the first state to secede from the Union in December 1860, and was one of the founding member states of the Confederacy in February 1861. The bombardment of the beleaguered U.S. garrison at Fort Sumter in Charleston Harbor on April 12, 1861 is generally recognized as the first military engagement of the war. The retaking of Charleston in February 1865, and raising the flag (the same flag) again at Fort Sumter, was used for the Union symbol of victory.

South Carolina provided around 60,000 troops for the Confederate Army. As the war progressed, former slaves and free blacks of South Carolina joined U.S. Colored Troops regiments for the Union Army (most Blacks in South Carolina were enslaved  at the war's outset). The state also provided uniforms, textiles, food, and war material, as well as trained soldiers and leaders from The Citadel and other military schools. In contrast to most other Confederate states, South Carolina had a well-developed rail network linking all of its major cities without a break of gauge. 

Relatively free from Union occupation until the very end of the war, South Carolina hosted a number of prisoner of war camps. South Carolina also was the only Confederate state not to harbor pockets of anti-secessionist sentiment strong enough to send regiments of white men to fight for the Union, as every other state in the Confederacy did. However, the Upstate region of the state would serve as a haven for Confederate Army deserters and resisters, as they used the Upstate topography and traditional community relations to resist service in the Confederate ranks.

Among the leading generals from the Palmetto State were Wade Hampton III, one of the Confederacy's foremost cavalry commanders, Maxcy Gregg, killed in action at Fredericksburg, Joseph B. Kershaw, whose South Carolina infantry brigade saw some of the hardest fighting of the Army of Northern Virginia and James Longstreet, the senior lieutenant general in the army, and Stephen D. Lee, the youngest lieutenant general.

Background
The white population of the state had strongly supported the institution of slavery since the 18th century. Political leaders such as Democrats John Calhoun and Preston Brooks had inflamed regional and national passions in support of the institution, and many pro-slavery voices had cried for secession.

For decades, South Carolinian political leaders had promoted regional passions with threats of nullification and secession in the name of southern states' rights and protection of the interests of the slave power.

Alfred P. Aldrich, a South Carolinian politician from Barnwell, stated that declaring secession would be necessary if a Republican candidate were to win the 1860 U.S. presidential election, stating that it was the only way for the state to preserve slavery and diminish the influence of the anti-slavery Republican Party, which, were its goals of abolition realized, would result in the "destruction of the South":

In a January 1860 speech, South Carolinian congressman Laurence Massillon Keitt, summed up this view in an oratory condemning the "anti-slavery party" (i.e. the Republican Party) for its views against slavery. He claimed that slavery was not morally wrong, but rather, justified:

Later that year, in December, Keitt would state that South Carolina's declaring of secession was the direct result of slavery:

Secession
On November 9, 1860 the South Carolina General Assembly passed a "Resolution to Call the Election of Abraham Lincoln as U.S. President a Hostile Act" and stated its intention to declare secession from the United States.

In December 1860, amid the secession crisis, former South Carolinian congressman John McQueen wrote to a group of civic leaders in Richmond, Virginia, regarding the reasons as to why South Carolina was contemplating secession from the United States. In the letter, McQueen claimed that U.S. president-elect Abraham Lincoln supported equality and civil rights for African Americans as well as the abolition of slavery, and thus South Carolina, being opposed to such measures, was compelled to secede:

South Carolinian Presbyterian minister James Henley Thornwell also espoused a similar view to McQueen's, stating that slavery was justified under the Christian religion, and thus, those who viewed slavery as being immoral were opposed to Christianity:

And again, the Southern Presbyterian of S.C. declared that:

On November 10, 1860 the S.C. General Assembly called for a "Convention of the People of South Carolina" to consider secession. Delegates were to be elected on December 6. The secession convention convened in Columbia on December 17 and voted unanimously, 169-0, to declare secession from the United States. The convention then adjourned to Charleston to draft an ordinance of secession. When the ordinance was adopted on December 20, 1860, South Carolina became the first slave state in the south to declare that it had seceded from the United States. James Buchanan, the United States president, declared the ordinance illegal but did not act to stop it.

A committee of the convention also drafted a Declaration of the Immediate Causes Which Induce and Justify the Secession of South Carolina which was adopted on December 24. The secession declaration stated the primary reasoning behind South Carolina's declaring of secession from the U.S., which was described as:

The declaration also claims that secession was declared as a result of the refusal of free states to enforce the Fugitive Slave Acts. Although the declaration does argue that secession is justified on the grounds of U.S. "encroachments upon the reserved rights of the States," the grievances that the declaration goes on to list are mainly concerned with the property of rights of slave holders. Broadly speaking, the declaration argues that the U.S. Constitution was framed to establish each State "as an equal" in the Union, with "separate control over its own institutions", such as "the right of property in slaves."

A repeated concern is runaway slaves. The declaration argues that parts of the U.S. Constitution were specifically written to ensure the return of slaves who had escaped to other states, and quotes the 4th Article: "No person held to service or labor in one State, under the laws thereof, escaping into another, shall, in consequence of any law or regulation therein, be discharged from such service or labor, but shall be delivered up, on claim of the party to whom such service or labor may be due." The declaration goes on to state that this stipulation of the Constitution was so important to the original signers, "that without it that compact [the Constitution] would not have been made." Laws from the "General Government" upheld this stipulation "for many years," the declaration says, but "an increasing hostility on the part of the non-slaveholding States to the Institution of Slavery has led to a disregard of their obligations." Because the constitutional agreement had been "deliberately broken and disregarded by the non-slaveholding States," the consequence was that "South Carolina is released from her obligation" to be part of the Union.

A further concern was Lincoln's recent election to the presidency, whom they claimed desired to see slavery on "the course of ultimate extinction":

The South Carolinian secession declaration of December 1860 also channeled some elements from the U.S. Declaration of Independence from July 1776. However, the South Carolinian version omitted the phrases that "all men are created equal", "that they are endowed by their Creator with certain unalienable Rights", and mentions of the "consent of the governed". Professor and historian Harry V. Jaffa noted these omissions as significant in his 2000 book, A New Birth of Freedom: Abraham Lincoln and the Coming of the Civil War:

Jaffa states that South Carolina omitted references to human equality and consent of the governed in its secession declaration, as due to their racist and pro-slavery views, secessionist South Carolinians did not believe in those ideals:

On December 25, the day following South Carolina's declaration of secession, a South Carolinian convention delivered an "Address to the Slaveholding States":

"Slavery, not states' rights, birthed the Civil War," argues sociologist James W. Loewen. Writing of South Carolina's Declaration of Secession, Loewen writes that

The state adopted the palmetto flag as its banner, a slightly modified version of which is used as its current state flag. South Carolina after secession was frequently called the "Palmetto Republic".

After South Carolina declared its secession, former congressman James L. Petigru famously remarked, "South Carolina is too small for a republic and too large for an insane asylum." Soon afterwards, South Carolina began preparing for a presumed U.S. military response while working to convince other southern states to secede as well and join in a confederacy of southern states.

On February 4, 1861, in Montgomery, Alabama, a convention consisting of delegates from South Carolina, Florida, Alabama, Mississippi, Georgia, and Louisiana met to form a new constitution and government modeled on that of the United States. On February 8, 1861, South Carolina officially joined the Confederacy. According to one South Carolinian newspaper editor:

South Carolina's declaring of secession was supported by the state's religious figures, who claimed that it was consistent with the tenets of their religion:

American Civil War

Fort Sumter

Six days after secession, on the day after Christmas, Major Robert Anderson, commander of the U.S. troops in Charleston, withdrew his troops to the island fortress of Fort Sumter in Charleston Harbor. South Carolina militia swarmed over the abandoned mainland batteries and trained their guns on the island. Sumter was the key position for preventing a naval attack upon Charleston, so secessionists were determined not to allow U.S. forces to remain there indefinitely. More importantly, South Carolina's claim of independence would look empty if U.S. forces controlled its largest harbor. On January 9, 1861, the U.S. ship Star of the West approached to resupply the fort. Cadets from The Citadel, The Military College of South Carolina fired upon the Star of the West, striking the ship three times and causing it to retreat back to New York.

Mississippi declared its secession several weeks after South Carolina, and five other states of the lower South soon followed. Both the outgoing Buchanan administration and President-elect Lincoln had denied that any state had a right to secede. Upper Southern slave states such as Virginia and North Carolina, which had initially voted against secession, called a peace conference, to little effect. Meanwhile, Virginian orator Roger Pryor barreled into Charleston and proclaimed that the only way to get his state to join the Confederacy was for South Carolina to instigate war with the United States. The obvious place to start was right in the midst of Charleston Harbor.

On April 10, the Mercury reprinted stories from New York papers that told of a naval expedition that had been sent southward toward Charleston. Lincoln advised the governor of South Carolina that the ships were sent to resupply the fort, not to reinforce it. The Carolinians could no longer wait if they hoped to take the fort before the U.S. Navy arrived. About 6,000 men were stationed around the rim of the harbor, ready to take on the 60 men in Fort Sumter. At 4:30 a.m. on April 12, after two days of intense negotiations, and with Union ships approaching the harbor, the firing began. Students from The Citadel were among those firing the first shots of the war, though Edmund Ruffin is usually credited with firing the first shot. Thirty-four hours later, Anderson's men raised the white flag and were allowed to leave the fort with colors flying and drums beating, saluting the U.S. flag with a 50-gun salute before taking it down. During this salute, one of the guns exploded, killing a young soldier—the only casualty of the bombardment and the first casualty of the war.

In December 1861, South Carolina received $100,000 from Georgia after a disastrous fire in Charleston.

Robert Smalls

Robert Smalls (1839 – 1915) was born into slavery in Beaufort, South Carolina.  On May 13, 1863, he freed himself, his crew, and their families by commandeering a Confederate transport ship, CSS Planter, in Charleston harbor, and sailing it from Confederate-controlled waters of the harbor to the U.S. blockade that surrounded it. He then piloted the ship to the Union-controlled enclave in Beaufort–Port Royal–Hilton Head area, where it became a Union warship. His example and persuasion helped convince President Abraham Lincoln to accept African-American soldiers into the Union Army.  After the war Smalls helped found the Republican Party in South Carolina and was elected five times to the U.S. Congress.

Fort Wagner
Fort Wagner was the scene of two battles.
The First Battle of Fort Wagner, occurred on July 11, 1863. Only 12 Confederate soldiers were killed, as opposed to the Union's 339 losses.

The Second Battle of Fort Wagner, a week later, is better known. This was the Union attack on July 18, 1863, led by the 54th Massachusetts Volunteer Infantry, one of the first major American military units made up of black soldiers. Colonel Robert Gould Shaw led the 54th Massachusetts on foot while they charged, and was killed in the assault.

Although a tactical defeat, the publicity of the battle of Fort Wagner led to further action for black troops in the Civil War, and it spurred additional recruitment that gave the Union Army a further numerical advantage in troops over the South.

The Union besieged the fort after the unsuccessful assault. By August 25, Union entrenchments were close enough to attempt an assault on the Advanced Rifle Pits, 240 yards in front of the Battery, but this attempt was defeated. A second attempt, by the 24th Mass. Inf., on August 26 was successful. After enduring almost 60 days of heavy shelling, the Confederates abandoned it on the night of September 6–7, 1863. withdrawing all operable cannons and the garrison.

Port Royal experiment
The Port Royal Experiment was a program in which former slaves successfully worked on the land abandoned by planters. In 1861 the Union captured the Sea Islands off the coast of South Carolina and their main harbor, Port Royal. The white residents fled, leaving behind 10,000 black slaves. Several private Northern charity organizations stepped in to set up schools and help the former slaves become self-sufficient. The result was a model of what Reconstruction could have been. The African Americans demonstrated their ability to work the land efficiently and live independently of white control. They assigned themselves daily tasks for cotton growing and spent their extra time cultivating their own crops, fishing and hunting. By selling their surplus crops, the locals acquired small amounts of property.

Charleston

The city under siege took control of Fort Sumter, became the center for blockade running.

In 1865, Union troops moved into the city, and took control of many sites, such as the United States Arsenal, which the Confederate army had seized at the outbreak of the war.

The war ends

The Confederates were at a disadvantage in men, weaponry, and supplies. Union ships sailed south and blocked off one port after another. As early as November, Union troops occupied the Sea Islands in the Beaufort area, establishing an important base for the men and ships who would obstruct the ports at Charleston and Savannah. Many plantation owners had already gone off with the Confederate Army; those still at home and their families fled. In a type of reparation long discussed in abolitionist literature, the abandoned plantations were confiscated by the Union Army and then given to the African Americans who had done the work of them. The Sea Islands became the laboratory for Union plans to educate the African Americans for their eventual role as full American citizens.

Despite South Carolina's important role in the beginning of the war, and a long unsuccessful attempt to take Charleston from 1863 onward, few military engagements occurred within the state's borders until 1865, when Sherman's Army, having already completed its March to the Sea in Savannah, marched to Columbia and leveled most of the town, as well as a number of towns along the way and afterward. South Carolina lost 12,922 men to the war, 23% of its male white population of fighting age, and the highest percentage of any state in the nation. Sherman's 1865 march through the Carolinas resulted in the burning of Columbia and numerous other towns. The destruction his troops wrought upon South Carolina was even worse than in Georgia, because many of his soldiers bore a particular grudge against the state and its citizens, whom they blamed for starting the war. One of Sherman's men declared, "Here is where treason began and, by God, here is where it shall end!" Deprived of the free labor of the formerly enslaved, poverty would mark the state for generations to come.

In January 1865, the Charleston Courier newspaper condemned suggestions that the Confederacy abandon slavery were it to help in gaining independence, stating that such suggestions were "folly":

On February 21, 1865, with the Confederate forces finally evacuated from Charleston, the black 54th Massachusetts Regiment marched through the city. At a ceremony at which the U.S. flag was once again raised over Fort Sumter, former fort commander Robert Anderson was joined on the platform by two men: African American Union hero Robert Smalls and the son of Denmark Vesey.

Battles in South Carolina

 Battle of Fort Sumter
 Battle of Port Royal
 Battle of Secessionville
 Battle of Simmon's Bluff
 First Battle of Charleston Harbor
 Second Battle of Charleston Harbor
 Second Battle of Fort Sumter
 First Battle of Fort Wagner
 Battle of Grimball's Landing
 Second Battle of Fort Wagner (Morris Island)
 Battle of Honey Hill
 Battle of Tulifinny
 Battle of Rivers' Bridge
 Battle of Anderson County
 Battle of Brattonsville
 Battle of Broxton's Bridge
 Battle of Cheraw
 Battle of Gamble's Hotel (The Columns)
 Battle of Aiken

Restoration to Union
Following the end of the Civil War, South Carolina was part of the Second Military District.

After meeting the requirements of Reconstruction, including ratifying amendments to the US Constitution to abolish slavery and grant citizenship to former slaves, South Carolina's representatives were readmitted to Congress. The state was fully restored to the United States on July 9, 1868.

As part of the Compromise of 1877, in which Southern Democrats would acknowledge Republican Rutherford B. Hayes as president, Republicans would meet certain demands. One affecting South Carolina was the removal of all U.S. military forces from the former Confederate states. At the time, U.S. troops remained in only Louisiana, South Carolina, and Florida, but the Compromise completed their withdrawal from the region.

See also

 List of South Carolina Confederate Civil War units
 List of South Carolina Union Civil War units

References

Further reading

 Barrett, John G. Sherman’s March through the Carolinas (University of North Carolina Press, 1956). online
 Billingsley, Andrew. Yearning to Breathe Free: Robert Smalls of South Carolina and His Families (2007); see Robert Smalls
 Bostick, Douglas W. The Union is Dissolved!: Charleston and Fort Sumter in the Civil War (The History Press, 2009)
 Burton, E. Milby. The Siege of Charleston, 1861–1865 (University of South Carolina Press, 1970)
 Cauthen, Charles Edward; Power, J. Tracy. South Carolina goes to war, 1860–1865. Columbia, SC: University of South Carolina Press, 2005. Originally published: Chapel Hill, NC: University of North Carolina Press, 1950. . online
 Channing, Steven. Crisis of Fear: Secession in South Carolina (1970) online
 Cisco, Walter Brian. States Rights Gist: a South Carolina general of the Civil War (1991) online
 Edgar, Walter. South Carolina: A History, (Columbia, SC: University of South Carolina Press: 1998). . 
 Drago, Edmund L. Confederate Phoenix: Rebel Children and Their Families in South Carolina (Fordham Univ Press, 2008).
 Edgar, Walter, ed. The South Carolina Encyclopedia (University of South Carolina Press, 2006) ISBN 1-57003-598-9, comprehensive scholarly guide; details on Civil War in each locality.
 Jenkins, Wilbert L. Seizing the New Day: African Americans in Post-Civil War Charleston (Indiana University Press, 2003) online.
 Lager, Eric, "The Transformation of a Confederate State: War and Politics on the South Carolina Home Front, 1861-1862. " (PhD diss., University of Tennessee, 2019) online
 Lucas, Marion B. Sherman and the Burning of Columbia (Univ of South Carolina Press, 2021).
 McDonnell, Lawrence T. Performing disunion: the coming of the Civil War in Charleston, South Carolina (Cambridge University Press, 2018).
 Marrs, Aaron W. "Desertion and Loyalty in the South Carolina Infantry 1861-1863." Civil War History 50.1 (2004): 47-65.
 Otten, James T. "Disloyalty in the upper districts of South Carolina during the Civil War." South Carolina Historical Magazine 75.2 (1974): 95-110. online
 Poole, W. Scott. South Carolina's Civil War: A Narrative History (Mercer University Press, 2005) online.
 Powers Jr., Bernard E. Black Charlestonians (1994), covers 1822-1885.
 Racine, Philip N. Living a Big War in a Small Place: Spartanburg, South Carolina, during the Confederacy (Univ of South Carolina Press, 2013).
 Rose, Willie Lee. Rehearsal for Reconstruction: The Port Royal Experiment (1964) online; farms for freed slaves.
 Rowland, Lawrence S., and Stephen G. Hoffius, eds. The Civil War in South Carolina: Selections from the South Carolina Historical Magazine (Home House, 2001).
 Saville, Julie. The Work of Reconstruction: From Slave to Wage Laborer in South Carolina 1860-1870 (Cambridge UP, 1994). excerpt
 Schwalm, Leslie A. A Hard Fight for We: Women’s Transition from Slavery to Freedom in South Carolina (University of Illinois Press, 1997).
 Seigler, Robert S. South Carolina’s Military Organization during the War Between the States. (4 vols., History Press, 2008).
 Sinha, Manisha. "Revolution or Counterrevolution?: The Political Ideology of Seccession in Antebellum South Carolina." Civil War History 46.3 (2000): 205-226.
 Stone, H. David. Vital Rails: The Charleston & Savannah Railroad and the Civil War in Coastal South Carolina (Univ of South Carolina Press, 2008).
 Stokes, Karen. South Carolina civilians in Sherman's path: stories of courage amid Civil War destruction (2012) online
 Verney, Kevern J. "Trespassers in the land of their birth: Blacks and landownership in South Carolina and Mississippi during the civil war and reconstruction, 1861–1877." Slavery and Abolition 4.1 (1983): 64-78.
 West, Stephen A. “Minute Men, Yeomen, and the Mobilization for Secession in the South Carolina Upcountry.” Journal of Southern History 71#1 (2005): 75-104.
 Wise, Stephen R., Lawrence S. Rowland, and Gerhard Spieler. Rebellion, Reconstruction, and Redemption, 1861-1893: The History of Beaufort County, South Carolina (U of South Carolina Press, 2015).
 Woody, Robert H. "Some Aspects of the Economic Condition of South Carolina After the Civil War." North Carolina Historical Review 7.3 (1930): 346-364. online
 Wooster, Ralph. “Membership of the South Carolina Secession Convention.” South Carolina Historical Magazine 55 (1954): 185-97.
 Zornow, William Frank. "State Aid for Indigent Families of South Carolina Soldiers, 1861-1865." South Carolina Historical Magazine 57 (1956): 82-87.

Historiography and memory
 Brown, Thomas J. Civil War Canon: Sites of Confederate Memory in South Carolina (UNC Press Books, 2015).
 Lees, William B. " 'The Best Ever Occupied...': Archaeological Investigations of a Civil War Encampment on Folly Island, South Carolina." (1995): 104-106. online
 Miller, Richard F. States at War, Volume 6: The Confederate States Chronology and a Reference Guide for South Carolina in the Civil War (2018) excerpt; 855pp
 Rogers Jr. George C. and C. James Taylor. A South Carolina Chronology, 1497-1992 2nd Ed. (1994).
 Rogers, Jeffery J. A Southern Writer and the Civil War: The Confederate Imagination of William Gilmore Simms (Lexington Books, 2015).
 Smith, Steven D., Christopher Ohm Clement, and Stephen R. Wise. "GPS, GIS and the Civil War battlefield landscape: A South Carolina low country example." Historical Archaeology 37.3 (2003): 14-30.

Primary sources
 Jones, J. Keith, ed. The Boys of Diamond Hill: The Lives and Civil War Letters of the Boyd Family of Abbeville County, South Carolina (2011) online review
 Lee, J. Edward, and Ron Chepesiuk, eds. South Carolina in the Civil War: The Confederate Experience in Letters and Diaries (McFarland, 2004).
 McCaslin, Richard B. A Photographic History of South Carolina in the Civil War (U of Arkansas Press, 1994) online
 Morris, J. Brent, ed. Yes, Lord, I Know the Road: A Documentary History of African Americans in South Carolina, 1526-2008 (University of South Carolina Press, 2017).
 Simms, William Gilmore. A City Laid Waste: The Capture, Sack, and Destruction of the City of Columbia (1865; reprinted 2011) online
 Smith, Steven D. "Whom we would never more see: history and archaeology recover the lives and deaths of African American Civil War soldiers on Folly Island, South Carolina." (South Carolina State Documents Depository, 1993). online
  Taylor, Susie King. A Black woman's Civil War memoirs: reminiscences of my life in camp with the 33rd U.S. Colored Troops, late 1st South Carolina Volunteers (1902, reprinted 1988) online
 Taylor, Frances Wallace, Catherine Taylor Matthews, and J. Tracy Power, eds. The Leverett Letters: Correspondence of a South Carolina Family, 1851-1868 (Univ of South Carolina Press, 2000) online.

External links

 Declaration of the Immediate Causes Which Induce and Justify the Secession of South Carolina from the Federal Union
 National Park Service map of Civil War sites in South Carolina

 
.American Civil War
American Civil War by state
American Civil War
 
Western Theater of the American Civil War